Cosmos is a Canadian drama film, released in 1996. Written and directed by Jennifer Alleyn, Manon Briand, Marie-Julie Dallaire, Arto Paragamian, André Turpin and Denis Villeneuve, the film is an anthology of six short films, one by each of the credited directors, linked by the common character of Cosmos (Igor Ovadis), a Greek immigrant working as a cab driver in Montreal.

The film, made by a collective of then-emerging young directors, was considered an unofficial sequel to Montreal Stories (Montréal vu par...), a 1991 anthology film by six more established filmmakers.

The film was Canada's submission to the 70th Academy Awards for Best Foreign Language Film, but did not make the shortlist. It was also a shortlisted nominee for Best Motion Picture at the 18th Genie Awards, but lost to The Sweet Hereafter.

Segments
"Jules et Fanny" (André Turpin) — Fanny (Marie-France Lambert), a lawyer, reunites with Jules (Alexis Martin), her ex-boyfriend who is fascinated by her new breast implants.
"Cosmos et agriculture" (Arto Paragamian) — Cosmos and Janvier (Marc Jeanty) chase down two men who have stolen a cab.
"Le Technétium" (Denis Villeneuve) — A filmmaker (David La Haye) nervously travels to a scheduled television interview with Nadja (Audrey Benoît).
"Aurore et Crépuscule" (Jennifer Alleyn) — After being stood up by her boyfriend on her 20th birthday, Aurore (Sarah-Jeanne Salvy) meets an older man (Gabriel Gascon) who takes her out to play pool.
"Boost" (Manon Briand) — Yannie (Marie-Hélène Montpetit) spends the day with Joël (Pascal Contamine), a gay friend anxiously awaiting the results of his HIV test.
"L'Individu" (Marie-Julie Dallaire) — A serial killer (Sébastien Joannette) tracks his planned next victim.

See also
 List of submissions to the 70th Academy Awards for Best Foreign Language Film
 List of Canadian submissions for the Academy Award for Best Foreign Language Film

References

External links 

1996 films
Canadian drama films
Canadian LGBT-related films
LGBT-related drama films
Films directed by Denis Villeneuve
Canadian anthology films
1996 drama films
1996 LGBT-related films
Films set in Montreal
Films directed by Manon Briand
French-language Canadian films
HIV/AIDS in Canadian films
1990s Canadian films